Kloos is a surname. Notable people with the surname include:

Basina Kloos (born 1940), German nun
Cornelis Kloos (1895-1976), Dutch painter
Elmer Kloos (1908–?), German boxer
Justin Kloos (born 1993), American ice hockey player
Marko Kloos, German author
Rick Kloos, (born 1966), American politician
Willem Kloos (1859–1938), Dutch poet and literary critic

See also
Kroos